The municipality of Quebracho is one of the municipalities of Paysandú Department. Its seat is the city of Quebracho.

Location 
The municipality is located in the west section of Paysandú Department, south to the municipality of Chapicuy and north to the municipality of Lorenzo Geyres. To its west it is the Entre Ríos Province, Argentina.

History 
The Municipality was created by Law N° 18653 of 15 March 2020, in compliance with the provisions of the Law N° 18567 that provided for the creation of municipalities over all settlements with 2000 or more inhabitants. It is part of the Paysandú Department and comprises the KFA and KFC electoral districts or constituencies of the department. Its limits were determined by Departmental Decree of the Departmental Board of Paysandú N° 6064/2010.

Settlements 
The following settlements are part of this municipality:
 Quebracho (seat)
 Colonia Arroyo Malo

Authorities 
The authority of the municipality is the Municipal Council, integrated by the Mayor (who presides it) and four Councilors.

References 

Quebracho